The CHL Canada–Russia Series is an annual junior ice hockey exhibition tournament, held between a select team of Russian players and all-star teams representing the Quebec Major Junior Hockey League, the Ontario Hockey League, and the Western Hockey League. The event is organized by the Canadian Hockey League and consists of six games total each year, with the Russian Selects playing two games versus each league’s all-star team. All games are broadcast nationally in Canada on Sportsnet. The series often features players from the Canadian national junior team, and the Russian national junior team. 

The first series held in 2003 as the RE/MAX Canada–Russia Challenge, and was envisioned as tune-up for the World Junior Ice Hockey Championships. The event has had several corporate sponsors and names including, the ADT Canada–Russia Challenge from 2004 until 2008, and the Subway Super Series from 2009 until 2014. The 2015 series did not have a title sponsor. In 2016, CIBC picked up the naming rights for five years and renamed the event CIBC Canada–Russia Series. In response to the 2022 Russian invasion of Ukraine, the event was cancelled as of 2022.

2003 RE/MAX Canada–Russia Challenge 

The annual series began in 2003. It was known as the RE/MAX Canada–Russia Challenge after its sponsor RE/MAX, a real estate agency. The CHL won five of the six games. Alexandre Picard led the event with 6 points. Ryan Getzlaf and Dion Phaneuf both scored two goals and two assists for the WHL. Ben Eager led the OHL with two goals. The top scoring Russian was Alexander Shinin with 4 points.

2004 ADT Canada–Russia Challenge 

The ADT Corporation became the corporate title sponsor of the series. Russia defeated the QMJHL in both games by 4–3 shootout wins. Russia lost the next four games to the OHL and WHL, losing the series four games to two. Mikhail Yunkov led Russia with 6 points. Eric Fehr scored 3 goals for the WHL, and Dave Bolland scored twice for the OHL.

2005 ADT Canada–Russia Challenge 

The third series saw the CHL win all six games by at least two-goal margins. Guillaume Latendresse of the QMJHL led the event with 5 goals. Wojtek Wolski scored 4 times for the OHL. Kyle Chipchura led the WHL with 4 points. Sergei Ogorodnikov scored 3 goals and 3 assists for Russia, while Alexander Mayer scored 4 goals.

2006 ADT Canada–Russia Challenge 

The CHL won all six games, outscoring Russia by 20 goals, and swept the series for the second year in a row. Brodie Dupont and Zach Boychuk led the CHL with 4 points. Egor Milovzorov led Russia with 6 points, while Vadim Shipachyov led with 4 goals.

2007 ADT Canada–Russia Challenge 

The 2007 series was much closer than the previous two. Russia won the first game 6–4, ending a 16-game losing streak at the event. Goal scoring was much closer, as the goals totalled 21–19 in favour of the CHL. The CHL won three games in regulation, and the fourth win came in a shootout. John Tavares led the CHL with 4 points. Mikhail Milekhin scored 4 times for Russia, while Anton Korolev led the team with 6 points.

2008 ADT Canada–Russia Challenge 

The CHL teams won five out of six games, scoring 24 goals and conceding 13. Eight different players led the event with 4 points: Cody Hodgson, John Tavares, Jordan Eberle and Thomas Hickey for the CHL; and Pavel Chernov, Nikita Klyukin, Evgenii Dadonov and Anatoli Nikontsev for Russia.

2009 Subway Super Series 

Subway, a restaurant chain, became the corporate title sponsor. The CHL teams won all six games, scoring 27 goals and conceding 11. Luke Adam led the CHL with 5 points. Kirill Petrov led Russia with 5 points, while Maxim Kitsyn scored 4 goals.

2010 Subway Super Series 

Russia won both games against the QMJHL and both against the WHL, and won the series for the first time. The OHL won both games to remain unbeaten since 2003. Leading scorers for Russia were Maxim Kitsyn with four goals and two assists and Nikita Dvurechensky with two goals and four assists.

2011 Subway Super Series
The CHL teams won the series with three regulation wins, compared to two regulation wins and a shootout win for Russia. The OHL remained unbeaten since the series began in 2003. Ryan Spooner led CHL scorers with 6 points, followed by Jordan Weal with 4 points. Nikita Kucherov and Nikita Gusev led Russia with seven points each, followed by Daniil Apalkov with 6 points.

2012 Subway Super Series
Russia won the 2012 series with three regulation wins, and a point from a shootout loss. Russia also won its first game against the OHL in the history of the series. Jonathan Huberdeau led all players with 5 points. Only 29 goals were scored in the series, with no player getting more than two.

2013 Subway Super Series
The CHL won the series with three regulation wins, and an overtime loss, compared to two wins and an overtime win for Russia. Igor Rudenkov led Russia with three goals and five points. Charles Hudon and Jonathan Drouin were the top scoring Canadians, with four points each.

2014 Subway Super Series
Russia won the series with three regulation wins and a shootout win, despite only scoring 15 goals in the series. Ivan Fischenko was the only player to score four points in the series.

2015 Canada/Russia Series
The 2015 Canada/Russia Series was played without a corporate title sponsor. CHL teams won five of the six games played, outscoring Russia 24 to 13. Artur Lauta and Spencer Watson led the event with three goals each. Collin Shirley was the top scorer with five points.

2016 CIBC Canada/Russia Series

Canadian Imperial Bank of Commerce became the corporate title sponsor of the CHL Canada/Russia series. CHL teams won the series with 3 regulation wins, and an overtime loss. Alexandre Fortin led all scorers in the event with four points.

2017 CIBC Canada/Russia Series
The 2017 series was tied with three regulation wins each. The CHL prevailed after a shootout, held at the conclusion of game six. Dillon Dubé led the CHL with five points. Alexey Polodyan led Russia with three goals and three assists.

2018 CIBC Canada/Russia Series
Russia won the 2018 series 11 points to 7, after a come-from-behind overtime win in game six. Stepan Starkov led Russia in scoring with 6 points, and goaltender Pyotr Kochetkov won three games, allowing only two goals against.

2019 CIBC Canada/Russia Series 
The 2019 series was tied with nine points each. The CHL prevailed after a shootout, held at the conclusion of game six.

2020 and 2021 CIBC Canada/Russia Series
Both the 2020 and 2021 Canada/Russia Series were cancelled due to the COVID-19 pandemic.

2022 Canada/Russia Series 
The 2022 Canada/Russia Series was cancelled in response to Russia's invasion of Ukraine in February 2022.

All-time record 
The Canadian Hockey League has won 12 of the 17 series played as of 2019.

Updated through November 15, 2019

See also
 2007 Super Series

References

External links
 Official website of the CHL Canada/Russia Series
 Official website of the Canadian Hockey League

Canada–Russia relations
Canada men's national junior ice hockey team games
Canadian Hockey League events
International ice hockey competitions hosted by Canada
Junior ice hockey in Russia
Russia men's national ice hockey team games
Super Series